Michael James Kale (born August 11, 1943) is a retired Canadian musician, best known as the original bassist for the rock band The Guess Who. He also served in the band Scrubbaloe Caine. In 1987, he was inducted into the Canadian Music Hall of Fame as a member of The Guess Who.

Career 

Kale joined the local Winnipeg band Chad Allan and the Reflections in 1962; that band later evolved into The Guess Who. Kale was the band's bassist during its most successful period up to 1972, appearing on several hit singles and albums and co-writing the band's best-known song, "American Woman", which reached no. 1 in Canada and the United States.

Kale left The Guess Who in 1972 after the Live at the Paramount album, going on to join Scrubbaloe Caine. Scrubbaloe Caine was nominated for the 1974 Juno Award for Most Promising Group, losing to Bachman–Turner Overdrive featuring Kale's former bandmate Randy Bachman. Kale left Scrubbaloe Caine in late 1974.

Meanwhile, The Guess Who had broken up in 1975, and in 1977 the CBC invited former members to participate in a reunion concert. Group leaders Bachman and Burton Cummings were not interested, but allowed Kale and several other former members to use The Guess Who's name for the event. Kale discovered that the band name had never been trademarked in Canada, and acquired ownership. He formed the first of many new line-ups of The Guess Who and toured the nostalgia circuit under the name. Kale's nostalgia line-ups of The Guess Who have been frequently criticized by Bachman and Cummings.

Kale led shifting nostalgia-oriented line-ups of The Guess Who regularly until 2016, and released several new albums under that name which received little notice. He was sometimes joined by original Guess Who drummer Garry Peterson. Kale also participated in a reunion of the classic Guess Who line-up with Peterson, Cummings, and Bachman in 1983, and another in 1999. After a break from 2000 to 2004, when a Cummings/Bachman reunion line-up toured extensively, Kale revived his nostalgia tour version of The Guess Who and continued touring with shifting line-ups until his retirement in 2016. He was replaced by Rudy Sarzo, and the band has continued under the leadership of Garry Peterson.

References 

1943 births
Living people
The Guess Who members
Canadian rock bass guitarists
Musicians from Winnipeg
20th-century Canadian bass guitarists
21st-century Canadian bass guitarists